Leptocollonia is a genus of sea snails, marine gastropod mollusks in the family Colloniidae.

Species
Species within the genus Leptocollonia include:
 Leptocollonia innocens (Thiele, 1912)
 Leptocollonia thielei A. W. B. Powell, 1951

References

 Engl W. (2012) Shells of Antarctica. Hackenheim: Conchbooks. 402 pp.

External links

Colloniidae